The 2022 Big South Conference men's basketball tournament was the postseason men's basketball tournament for the Big South Conference for the 2021–22 season. It was held from March 2–6, 2022, with all tournament games played at the Bojangles Coliseum in Charlotte, North Carolina. This was the first time since the 2016 edition that the tournament was held at a single neutral site location. The tournament winner, Longwood, received the conference's automatic bid to the NCAA tournament. The defending champions were the Winthrop Eagles.

Seeds 
With the addition of North Carolina A&T before the season, the conference increased its membership to 12 teams and split into divisions for the first time since 2013–14.  The division winners were awarded the top two seeds, with the rest of the teams being seeded by record, with a tiebreaker system to seed teams with identical conference records.

The tiebreakers operate in the following order:

 Head-to-head record.
 Record against the top-ranked conference team not involved in the tie, going down the standings until the tie is broken. For this purpose, teams with the same conference record are considered collectively. If two teams were unbeaten or winless against an opponent but did not play the same number of games against that opponent, the tie is not considered broken.

UNC Asheville got a higher seeding than Campbell due to the head-to-head record. High Point got a higher seeding than Radford got a better top-to-bottom record through High Point's win against Winthrop.

Schedule

Bracket 
* denotes overtime period

Game summaries

First round

References 

Tournament
Big South Conference men's basketball tournament
Basketball competitions in Charlotte, North Carolina
Big South Conference men's basketball tournament